Portrait of Blaise Cendrars is a 1917 oil on card painting by Amedeo Modigliani, showing the French writer Blaise Cendrars. Formerly part of the Riccardo Gualino collection, it is now in the Galleria Sabauda in Turin.

References

1917 paintings
Paintings by Amedeo Modigliani
Cendrars
Cendrars
Paintings in the Galleria Sabauda